Cyril Crowhurst (9 March 1906 – 29 January 1995)  was a British sound engineer. He was nominated for an Academy Award in the category of Best Sound Recording for the film Trio.

Selected filmography
 Trio (1950)

References

External links

1906 births
1995 deaths
British audio engineers
People from Greenwich
20th-century British engineers